A Resident Space Object (RSO) is a natural or artificial object that orbits another body e.g. Sun Orbiting, Earth Orbiting, Mars Orbiting etc. It is most often used to reference objects that are Earth orbiting. In the case of Earth orbiting the possible orbit classifications for an object are: Low Earth orbit (LEO), Medium Earth orbit (MEO), High Earth orbit (HEO) or  Geosynchronous Earth orbit (GEO).

Identification of RSOs
RSO acquisition, tracking, and data collection can be extremely challenging. The primary method for gathering this information is to make a direct observation of an RSO via Space surveillance sensors. However the system is not foolproof and RSOs can become lost to the tracking system. Additionally not all new objects are acquired in a timely fashion which means that these new objects, in addition to the lost RSOs, results in uncorrelated detections when they are finally observed. Since space-missions have been increasing over the years the number of uncorrelated targets is at an all-time high.

Cataloging
A number of international agencies endeavor to maintain catalogs of the man-made resident space objects (RSOs) currently orbiting the Earth. One example would be the Two-line element set public catalog.

References

External links
 Live Satellite Tracking: Operational & Non-Operational from AGI.

Orbits